Orthosie , also known as , is a natural satellite of Jupiter. It was discovered by a team of astronomers from the University of Hawaii led by Scott S. Sheppard in 2001, and given the temporary designation .

Orthosie is about 2 kilometres in diameter, and orbits Jupiter at an average distance of 21,075,662 km in 625.07 days, at an inclination of 146.46° to the ecliptic (143° to Jupiter's equator), in a retrograde direction and with an eccentricity of 0.3376.

It was named in August 2003 after Orthosie, the Greek goddess of prosperity and one of the Horae. The Horae (Hours) were daughters of Zeus and Themis.

Orthosie belongs to the Ananke group.

References

Ananke group
Moons of Jupiter
Irregular satellites
Discoveries by Scott S. Sheppard
Discoveries by David C. Jewitt
Discoveries by Yanga R. Fernandez
20011211
Moons with a retrograde orbit